Martina Hingis was the defending champion and won in the final 6–0, 6–2 against Conchita Martínez.

Seeds
A champion seed is indicated in bold text while text in italics indicates the round in which that seed was eliminated. The top four seeds received a bye to the second round.

  Martina Hingis (champion)
  Monica Seles (quarterfinals)
  Amanda Coetzer (semifinals)
  Lindsay Davenport (semifinals)
  Mary Pierce (first round)
  Conchita Martínez (final)
  Kimberly Po (quarterfinals)
  Lisa Raymond (second round)

Draw

Final

Section 1

Section 2

External links
 1997 Bank of the West Classic draw

Silicon Valley Classic
1997 WTA Tour